Buzan is a rural locality (a settlement) in Buzansky Selsoviet, Krasnoyarsky District, Astrakhan Oblast, Russia. The population was 1,010 as of 2010. There are 13 streets.

Geography 
Buzan is located 46 km northwest of Krasny Yar (the district's administrative centre) by road. Starourusovka is the nearest rural locality.

References 

Rural localities in Krasnoyarsky District, Astrakhan Oblast